Pushkin House is the common name for the Institute of Russian Literature in St. Petersburg.
Pushkin House may also refer to:
Pushkin House, London, a Russian cultural centre, London
Pushkin House (novel), Andrei Bitov's novel